The 1985 Yugoslavian motorcycle Grand Prix was the sixth round of the 1985 Grand Prix motorcycle racing season. It took place on the weekend of 14–16 June 1985 at the Automotodrom Rijeka.

Classification

500 cc

References

Yugoslav motorcycle Grand Prix
Yugoslavian
Motorcycle Grand Prix
Yugoslavian motorcycle Grand Prix